Călin Ion Moldovan (born 8 August 1967) is a Romanian former professional footballer and currently a manager. As a footballer, he played in the Divizia A for his hometown club FC Brașov, during the 1990s. After retirement, Moldovan started his football manager career, leading second and third tier teams such as Forex Brașov, Luceafărul Oradea or Metalurgistul Cugir, among others. He is currently under contract with Liga II side Corona Brașov.

Honours

Manager
Corona Brașov
Liga III: 2020–21
Liga IV: 2019–20

References

External links
 

1967 births
Living people
Sportspeople from Brașov
Romanian footballers
Association football midfielders
Liga I players
FC Brașov (1936) players
Hapoel Tayibe F.C. players
Liga Leumit players
Romanian expatriate footballers
Expatriate footballers in Israel
Romanian expatriate sportspeople in Israel
Romanian football managers
CS Luceafărul Oradea managers
CSM Corona Brașov (football) managers
FC Brașov (2021) managers